Neon Nights is the fourth studio album by Australian singer Dannii Minogue. It was released by London Records on 17 March 2003 and was primarily produced by Ian Masterson, Korpi & Blackcell, Neïmo and Terry Ronald. It was re-issued in November 2007 with a bonus disc of remixes and different artwork. In June 2018, to celebrate its 15th anniversary, the album was released on vinyl for the first time.

Background
Neon Nights received a generally positive reception from music critics, some of whom complimented its mix of pop sophistication, club culture and accessibility, and some of whom felt as though its 1980s retro sound was too dated. It was Minogue's first studio album in six years following 1997's Girl.

In November 2001, Minogue released the single, "Who Do You Love Now?", a collaboration with Riva. Described by Sound Generator as a "nice serene and dreamy vocal on the dance floor anthem", the song peaked at number three on the UK Singles Chart, and reached number one on the dance chart. The song is widely regarded as Minogue's comeback song. In Australia, the song peaked at number fifteen, while in the United States the song was released to dance clubs, and reached number twelve on the Billboard Dance Club chart. In 2001, Minogue signed a six-album deal with London Records, a subsidiary of Warner Music International.

Neon Nights became Minogue's most successful album release, and reached number eight in the United Kingdom, where it was certified Gold. In Australia the album was moderately successful, reaching number twenty-five on the albums chart, and it was nominated for Best Pop Release at the 2003 ARIA Music Awards, making it Minogue's only ARIA nomination to date.

Critical response

Neon Nights was met with generally positive reviews. John Lucas of AllMusic described it as a "varied collection, a veritable pick and mix of the European dance scene at the turn of the century" and felt that it "flows better than any of Dannii's albums have before." Jack Smith of BBC Music called it "a pleasant cocktail of pop sophistication, club culture and accessibility" that "goes a long way to remind the world of Dannii's powerful vocals." Alexis Kirke of MusicOMH praised the singles "Who Do You Love Now?", "Put the Needle on It" and "I Begin to Wonder" and stated that "if Dannii cannot win and hold a position of new popularity with this album [...], she may never get another chance." Ron Slomowicz of About.com felt that Neon Nights is "good pop music", though "generic in some songs" with some "obvious filler". In a retrospective for the album's 10th anniversary, Mike Wass of Idolator wrote that "it's one thing to create an excellent three-and-a-half-minute dance-pop song, but another to sustain the appeal over an entire album. Kylie managed it with Fever, Madonna followed suit on Confessions on a Dance Floor. Dannii's contribution to the genre is every bit as good as those classics."

Track listing

Deluxe edition (2007)

Disc one

Disc two

15th anniversary edition (2018)
In March 2018, as part of the celebration of Neon Nights''' 15th anniversary, Minogue announced a special reissue of the album on streaming, CD and, for the first time, on a limited edition 180g pink and blue double vinyl. While the digital and CD versions followed the same tracklisting of the Deluxe Edition released on 2007, the double colored vinyl featured a slightly revised selection of bonus tracks, most notably omitting the B-side "Nervous".

Side A

Side B

Side C

Side D

Samples
Multiple samples are featured on the album:
 "Mighty Fine" contains a sample from "Thighs High" performed by Tom Browne.
 "Push" contains a sample from "White Horse" performed by Laid Back.
 "Begin to Spin Me Around" is a mash-up between Minogue's song "I Begin to Wonder" and Dead or Alive's 1984 hit "You Spin Me Round (Like a Record)".
 "Don't Wanna Lose This Groove" is a mashup between Minogue's song "Don't Wanna Lose This Feeling" and Madonna's 1985 hit "Into the Groove".

Release and promotion

Promotion

Tour dates

Credits and personnel

Lead and backing vocals – Dannii Minogue
Backing vocals – Bruno Alexandre, Debbie French, James Khari, Ian Masterson, Anna Nordell, Karen Poole, Terry Ronald, Mitch Stevens
Guitar – Mattias Johansson, James Nisbett, Camille Troillard
Bass – Camille Troillard
Keyboards – Matthieu Joly, Camille Troillard

Drums – Matthieu Joly
Mixing – Etienne Colin, Niklas Flyckt, Pete 'Boxsta' Martin, Heff Moraes, Tim Speight
Programming – Ian Masterson
Engineering – Gil Cang, Ian Masterson
Photography – Matthew Donaldson

Charts

Certifications

Release details
All editions released by London/Warner Music Group/Ultra Records.

References

External links
DanniiMusic.com – official website (including lyrics to the songs on Neon Nights'').

2003 albums
Dannii Minogue albums
Warner Music Group albums
Ultra Records albums